Gidon Jablonka (born 30 October 1977) is a retired Israeli sprinter.

Gidon Jablonka competed in the 2000 Olympic 200 metres without reaching the final. He won five national championships. In the 4 x 100 metres relay, he competed at the 1999 World Championships, the 2000 Olympic Games, and the 2001 World Championships without reaching the final.

His personal best times were 10.29 seconds in the 100 metres, achieved in July 2000 in Tel Aviv; and 20.89 seconds in the 200 metres, achieved in July 2000 in Tel Aviv.

See also
Sports in Israel
List of Israeli records in athletics
List of Maccabiah records in athletics

References

External links
 

1977 births
Living people
Israeli male sprinters
Athletes (track and field) at the 2000 Summer Olympics
Olympic athletes of Israel